The Uvac is an international trans-boundary river, rising under Golija mountain and Pešter plateau, then flowing through southwestern Serbia and cross into eastern Bosnia and Herzegovina where, after 115 km, it finally meets the Lim river from the right, however, before it empties into the Lim, for a 10 kilometers Uvac forms the border between two countries. Also, while meandering through Serbia, Uvac loosely makes the northern border of the Raška region, too.

Upper course 

The Uvac originates at the Pešter plateau from the Ozren and Ninaja mountains, as Rasanska reka (Cyrillic: Расанска река). The stream curves around the Ninaja and Pometenik mountains, next to the villages of Tuzinje, Rasno, Dragojloviće and Gradac, where it meets Brnjička reka (Cyrillic: Брњичка река), enters the Sjenica depression and continues on the western border of the plain while receiving the right tributary Vapa (Cyrillic: Вапа) in the northern end. 

Vapa is 25 kilometers long and drains an area of 496 km2. It passes next to the villages of Gornja Vapa, Donja Vapa, Čedovo and Krstac, where it empties from the right into the shorter river Uvac.

Lower course 

The Uvac continues to the northwest, enters the Stari Vlah region where it flows in a deep, canyon-like valley, where it receives the Kladnica river from the right and generates much power, which is used for three powerful hydroelectric power stations, each one with big artificial lake: Bistrica with Lake Radoinja, Kokin Brod with Zlatar Lake (7,3 km2, altitude 400 m, depth 40 m) and Sjenica with Lake Sjenica.

In the lowest part of its course, the Uvac flows between the Zlatar and Zlatibor mountains, next to the villages of Kokin Brod and Radoinja until it reaches the Bosnian border and Varda mountain, makes a sharp, elbow turn to the south and after a short flow next to the villages of Bjelušine and Uvac (both on Bosnian side), the Uvac empties into the Lim, north of the city of Priboj.

The Uvac drains an area of 1,596 km2, belongs to the Black Sea drainage basin, and it is not navigable. Its average discharge at the mouth is 18 m³/s.

The river is famous for its gorge, Kanjon Uvca, the thriving colony of reintroduced griffon vultures and the Uvac Special Nature Reserve, protected since 1971.

References

Sources 

 Mala Prosvetina Enciklopedija, Third edition (1985); Prosveta; 
 Jovan Đ. Marković (1990): Enciklopedijski geografski leksikon Jugoslavije; Svjetlost-Sarajevo;

External links 

 Uvac Special Nature Reserve

Rivers of Bosnia and Herzegovina
Rivers of Serbia
Nature reserves in Serbia